The Bali are a clan of the Mohyal Brahmin community, who originated from North India, particularly the states of Jammu and Kashmir, Punjab and Delhi (after the partition).

Early history
The Mohyals' were once priests that resided near the ancient river of Saraswati, that used to flow from the Himalayas and down to the Arabian Sea. However during the Vedic Period, Bhagwan Parashurama, a famous warrior sage militarised these priests into fierce warriors that would go on to unify the areas of India and defend it from many invasions.

References

Indian surnames
Hindu surnames
Punjabi-language surnames
Punjabi tribes
Bali